The men's rings competition at the 2010 Asian Games in Guangzhou, China was held on 13 and 16 November 2010 at the Asian Games Town Gymnasium.

Schedule
All times are China Standard Time (UTC+08:00)

Results

Qualification

Final

References

Results

External links
Official website

Artistic Men rings